Not to be confused with the nearby Harquahala Mountains.

Harqua is a populated place situated in Maricopa County, Arizona, United States.

Built along the Southern Pacific Railroad, the townsite of Harqua is approximately 18 miles south-southeast of Tonopah.  Today it stands as a ghost town, (see: List of ghost towns in Arizona) with little more than a handful of crumbling foundations remaining.

References

External links
 
 

Populated places in Maricopa County, Arizona
Ghost towns in Arizona